ECPLA (N-ethyl-N-cyclopropyllysergamide) is an analog of lysergic acid diethylamide (LSD) developed by Synex Synthetics. In studies in mice, it was found to have approximately 40% the potency of LSD.

See also 
 ETFELA
 Methylisopropyllysergamide

References 

Lysergamides